Robert Josiah Bingaman (born November 4, 1981) is an American artist born in Wichita, Kansas and currently living and working in Kansas City, Missouri. Raised in a semi-suburban midwestern environment, his work consistently reflects several aspects of his upbringing, including the suburban landscape, the wonder of nature, and popular American architecture and design, as well as his own personal travels. Bingaman also intentionally relates his work to American and European literary sources such as Cormac McCarthy, David Foster Wallace, and W.G. Sebald, respectively. Bingaman is represented by Haw Contemporary in Kansas City, Missouri. His work consists of large-scale paintings and works on paper.

Education 
Bingaman received a Bachelor of Fine Arts in Painting from the University of Kansas in 2005 and a Master of Fine Arts in Visual Art from the Sam Fox School of Design & Visual Arts at Washington University in St. Louis in 2007.

Exhibitions 
In 2014, selections from "Night Pools", an ongoing series of paintings, were shown in his first one-person museum show at the Nerman Museum of Contemporary Art in Overland Park, Kansas. More recently, he expanded upon the pool motif with large-scale paintings for "Until It's All You See", a solo exhibition at Studios Inc, as part of a three-year residency program in Kansas City. In September 2016, he debuted a new body of work, "Memorial", at Haw Contemporary, in Kansas City, Missouri. His work has been shown in various group exhibitions across the United States.

Public Collections 
 The Art of Emprise, Emprise Bank, Wichita, Kansas
 Inergy, Kansas City, Missouri
 KPMG, Kansas City, Missouri
 Lockton, Kansas City, Missouri
 The University of Kansas School of Business, Lawrence, Kansas
 Nerman Museum of Contemporary Art, Overland Park, Kansas

References

Sources
 Abeln, Tracy, "At Studios Inc, Robert Bingaman's pools run deep", The Pitch, 2015, December
 Hoedel, Cindy, "Meet artist Robert Bingaman, whose pools of light reflect desire and void", The Kansas City Star, 2015, November
 Waxman, Lori, "What's new in American painting, here?", The Chicago Tribune, 2015, August
 Thorson, Alice, "The Year in Visual Art", The Kansas City Star, 2014, December
 Self, Dana, "Robert Bingaman’s shimmering ‘Night Pools’ offer a portal to the unknown", The Kansas City Star, 2014, July
 Thorson, Alice, "Nerman Museum gift shop to become Kansas Focus Gallery", The Kansas City Star, 2014, July
 Cook, Liz, "At Kemper at the Crossroads, there’s no place like home", The Pitch, 2013, June
 Thorson, Alice, "Kemper at the Crossroads Exhibit Highlights Kansas City Artists’ Vigor and Invention", The Kansas City Star, 2014, June
 Thorson, Alice, "‘Night Pools’ at Nerman Museum Leads a Lively Roster of Summer Art Exhibits", The Kansas City Star, 2014, May
 Eler, Alicia, "Meditations from the Middle", Hyperallergic, 2014, May
 Doolittle, Kayti, "State of the Arts: The effect of regionalism at Kemper in the Crossroads exhibit", Ink Magazine, 2014, April
 Kirby, Lauren, "KC Artists Take Studio Break And Paint Outdoors", KCUR.org, 2014, February
 Newman, Michelle Alexis, "The Landscape Paintings of Robert Josiah Bingaman", Beautiful Decay, 2013, February
 Kirsch, Elisabeth, "Plein Air, Plus Friends", The Kansas City Star Magazine, 2013, July
 Wilkins, Holly, "Meet Robert Josiah Bingaman and his magnificent technicolor paintings", It's Nice That, 2013, May
 Bembnister, Theresa, "Brushing up against the Kansas City Plein Air Coterie", The Pitch, 2013, February
 Caldwell, Ellen C., "In the Studio: The Process of a Painting with Robert Josiah Bingaman", newamericanpaintings.com, 2012, October
 Smith, Raechell, "Robert Josiah Bingaman", Catalogue Essay for The Kansas City Collection 2012–13, 2012, June

External links
 Bingaman's Official Website
 Bingaman at Haw Contemporary
 2015 Interview with Bingaman in The Kansas City Star
 2014 Interview with Bingaman in the Kansas City Star
 "Made in the Middle" Profile of Bingaman

1981 births
Living people
Artists from Wichita, Kansas
Sam Fox School of Design & Visual Arts alumni
University of Kansas alumni